Henri Rey (27 June 1932 – 12 February 2016) was a French basketball player. He competed in the men's tournament at the 1956 Summer Olympics.

References

External links
 

1932 births
2016 deaths
French men's basketball players
Olympic basketball players of France
Basketball players at the 1956 Summer Olympics
Place of birth missing
1954 FIBA World Championship players